is a town located in Kanagawa Prefecture, Japan. , the town had an estimated population of 9,878 and a population density of 44 persons per km².

Geography
Yamakita is located in the mountainous western portion of Kanagawa Prefecture, bordering Shizuoka and Yamanashi Prefectures. Much of the town is within the boundaries of the Tanzawa-Ōyama Quasi-National Park. Yamakita is approximately 50 kilometers west of Yokohama. Lake Tanzawa is located in the center of the town.

Surrounding municipalities
Kanagawa Prefecture
Sagamihara
Hadano
Minamiashigara
Nakai
Matsuda, Kaisei
Kiyokawa
Yamanashi Prefecture
Dōshi, Yamanakako
Shizuoka Prefecture
Oyama

Climate
Yamakita has a Humid subtropical climate (Köppen Cfa) characterized by warm summers and cool winters with light to no snowfall.  The average annual temperature in Yamakita is 11.6 °C. The average annual rainfall is 2042 mm with September as the wettest month. The temperatures are highest on average in August, at around 22.8 °C, and lowest in January, at around 0.4 °C.

Demographics
Per Japanese census data, the population of Yamakita has been declining since the 1950s.

History
During the Edo period the area around Yamakita was part of Odawara Domain, along with most of western Sagami Province. After the cadastral reforms of the early Meiji period, Kawa village was one of several villages established within Ashigarakami district, Kanagawa Prefecture on April 1, 1889 with the creation of the modern municipalities system. In the Meiji era, the town prospered as a transportation hub with the opening of the Tokaido Main Line railway, but when the line changed its route due to the opening of the Tanna Tunnel, its role rapidly declined. Kawa village was elevated to town status on April 1, 1933 and renamed Yamakita.  It merged with neighboring Kyowa, Shimizu and Miho villages on February 1, 1955 and further expanded by annexing the Hirayama area of former Kitaashigara village on April 1, 1955.

Government
Yamakita has a mayor-council form of government with a directly elected mayor and a unicameral town council of 14 members. Yamakita, together with the other municipalities in Ashigarakami District and Minamiashigara city, collectively contributes one member to the Kanagawa Prefectural Assembly. In terms of national politics, the town is part of Kanagawa 17th district of the lower house of the Diet of Japan.

Economy
The economy of Yamakita is based primarily on agriculture and forestry.

Education
Yamakita has two public elementary schools and two public middle schools operated by the town government. The town has one public high school operated by the Kanagawa Prefectural Board of Education, and there is one private high school.

Transportation

Railway
 JR Tokai – Gotemba Line
 -  -

Highway
 (Ōi-Matsuda interchange)

Local attractions

Mount Ōno
Shasui Falls
Nakagawa Cedar

Hot springs
Nakagawa Hot Springs

Camping areas
Yamakita Town Friendship Village
Lake Tanzawa Campsite
Lake Tanzawa Lodge
West Tanzawa Nakagawa Lodge
West Tanzawa Cottage Camp Ground

Parks
Kawamura Castle ruins Historical Park
Yamakita Railway Park

Festivals
Yamakita Cherry Blossom Festival（end of March ~ beginning of April）
Lake Tanzawa Fireworks Festival
West Tanzawa Autumn Momiji Festival

Events
Lake Tanzawa Fishing Festival
Lake Tanzawa Canoe Marathon
Lake Tanzawa Marathon
Christmas in Lake Tanzawa

Sports
Sakawa River Golf Club

Notable people from Yamakita
Yoshimi Ozaki, marathon runner

References

External links

Official Website 

 
Towns in Kanagawa Prefecture